Dynamo Kazan may refer to:

 Dynamo Kazan Bandy Club, known as Raketa prior to 2008
 WVC Dynamo Kazan, volleyball club
 Dinamo Kazan (field hockey), club competing in the Euro Hockey League
 FC Dynamo Kazan, association football club